Luba Lowery is a Russian-born American paralympic athlete. Lowery represented the United States in the 2010 Paralympic Games. Lowery has been involved in both competitive skiing and swimming.

Biography 
Lowery was born in Russia and was adopted when she was four years old. She grew up in Cumberland, Maine. When she was eight years old, because of a congenital bone defect, Proximal Focal Femoral Disorder (PFFD), her right leg was amputated. Lowery attended Gould Academy.

Lowery represented the United States in the 2010 Paralympic Games in Vancouver. She took seventh place in the slalom and ninth place in the giant slalom. 

Lowery's first open-water swimming race took place in 2015, where she came in 42nd in women's times and 118th overall. In October 2015, she was inducted into the Maine Ski Hall of Fame.

References

External links 
 Interview

People from Cumberland, Maine
Paralympic alpine skiers of the United States
Year of birth missing (living people)
Alpine skiers at the 2010 Winter Paralympics
Living people